Fidèle or Fidele may refer to:

 Fidèle (album), a 1981 album by Julio Iglesias
 Fidèle (dog) (2003–2016), a yellow Labrador and tourist attraction in Bruges, Belgium
 Bourg-Fidèle, a commune in the Ardennes department in northern France
 Saint-Fidèle, Quebec, Canada
 French frigate Fidèle (1789)
 French frigate Fidèle (1795)
 Le Fidèle, French name of the 2017 film Racer and the Jailbird

People with the given name
 Fidèle Agbatchi (born 1950), retired Beninese Roman Catholic archbishop
 Fidèle Dimou (born 1957), Congolese politician 
 Fidèle Dirokpa (fl. 2003–2009), Democratic Republic of the Congo Anglican bishop
 Fidèle Moungar (born 1948), Chadian doctor and a veteran politician who served as Prime Minister of Chad in 1993
 Jean-Fidele Diramba (born 1952), former football referee from the African state of Gabon

See also
 
 Fidel (disambiguation)